Pogona minor minima, the Abrolhos bearded dragon or Abrolhos dwarf bearded dragon, is an agamid lizard found only on islands at Houtman Abrolhos, and commonly named for this location. It is closely related to other bearded dragons found in Western Australia.

The size of the dragon is smaller than related subspecies, no more than 360 mm long (115 mm snout-vent length). It occurs in  sandy habitats or outcrops of limestone. The range is restricted to three islands of the Wallabi Group: North Island, East Wallabi Island, and West Wallabi Island. The distribution range of this subspecies is around 80 km from the mainland and its near relations.

References

catalogueoflife.org

Reptiles of Western Australia
minor minima
Reptiles described in 1933
Agamid lizards of Australia